Sebastian Gessl (born 30 June 1996) is an Austrian footballer.

Career

In 2006, Gessl joined the youth academy of Rapid Wien, Austria's most successful club.

In 2014, he signed for Karlsruher SC II in the German fifth division.

In 2018, he trialed with Scottish side Aberdeen.

In 2019, Gessl signed for Horn in the Austrian second division from the reserves of German Bundesliga team 1899 Hoffenheim.

References

External links
 

Austrian footballers
Living people
Association football goalkeepers
1996 births
Austria youth international footballers
Karlsruher SC II players
TSG 1899 Hoffenheim II players
SV Horn players